Edward John Peers (31 December 1886 – 20 September 1935) was a Wales international football goalkeeper. He won 12 caps for Wales and spent 1911 to 1921 at Wolverhampton Wanderers and then January 1922 to May 1923 at Port Vale.

Career
Peers played for Oswestry St. Clair's, Chirk, Connah's Quay Juniors, Connah's Quay Victoria, Connah's Quay, Shotton and Hednesford Town, before advancing to the Football League with Wolverhampton Wanderers in April 1911. They finished fifth in the Second Division in 1911–12, tenth in 1912–13, ninth in 1913–14, and fourth in 1914–15. He had a trial at Shrewsbury Town and guested for Walsall and Stoke City during World War I. He played 31 games for the "Potters" in 1917–18 and made 28 appearances at the Victoria Ground in 1918–19. He returned to Molineux, and helped "Wolves" to finish 19th in 1919–20 and 1920–21. Peers spent six months at Hednesford Town, before he joined Port Vale in January 1922 and became the club's first choice goalkeeper with Walter Smith out injured. He was the first Vale player to be capped whilst at the club. He was so confident in his defenders that he spent a lot of his time casually leaning on one of his goalposts. He played 15 Second Division games in the 1921–22 season, and oversaw a club record seven consecutive league games. He made 43 appearances in the 1922–23 campaign, with Daniel Smith deputizing in one match. He retired from league football at The Old Recreation Ground in May 1923 and returned to Hednesford Town for a three-year spell. He went on to run the New Inn and several other pubs in the Wolverhampton area.

Career statistics

Club statistics
Source:

International statistics

Honours
Port Vale
North Staffordshire Infirmary Cup: 1922

References

1886 births
1935 deaths
People from Connah's Quay
Sportspeople from Flintshire
Welsh footballers
Wales international footballers
Association football goalkeepers
Chirk AAA F.C. players
Connah's Quay F.C. players
Wolverhampton Wanderers F.C. players
Walsall F.C. wartime guest players
Stoke City F.C. wartime guest players
Port Vale F.C. players
Hednesford Town F.C. players
English Football League players